Real World/Road Rules Challenge (occasionally referred to as Real World vs. Road Rules) is the second season of the MTV reality game show, The Challenge. Cast members from The Real World and Road Rules competed for their share of $50,000.

The season marked the first time in which "Real World/Road Rules Challenge" would be used as the show's main title (by the 19th season, however, the program would be renamed yet again simply to The Challenge). In addition, it's one of two seasons absent of a subtitle (though the other, season 3, did have the year of its production as part of its title), a trend that wouldn't truly emerge until the show's 4th season.

It is the first six-on-six Challenge in the series. The teams traveled via tour bus and RV starting in San Francisco, ending in Universal City, California, competing in different individual challenges. The winning team had the right to travel in a tour bus, while the losing team had to travel in an RV. Each time a team won an individual challenge, they won the right to spend time in a "money machine". The "money machine", set up outside Universal Studios Hollywood in Universal City, California was a huge wind chamber that contained up to $50,000. Whatever the casts could keep on them, they were guaranteed to keep. This season also featured an additional challenge where the two teams competed over possession of a teddy bear. Whichever team had the teddy bear in their possession at an unknown, predetermined point in the challenge, would win the additional challenge.

Cast
Mr. Big: David Edwards from The Real World: Los Angeles

Challenge games
Roller Derby: Teams face off in a typical roller derby game. A player that passes the most opponents after one round earns a point for the team. The team that earns the most points at the end of the game wins.
 Winners: Road Rules
Bed Race: Teams are instructed to come up with a theme and decorate a mattress in preparation for the mission. One member of the team stays on the bed while the rest of the team pushes the bed down a road in a race against the opposite team. The team that wins two races out of three wins.
 Winners: Road Rules
Bungee Jump: Players from the team are strapped by the ankles and are instructed to bungee jump from a high place down into a lake where colored rings are placed. Each ring is worth one point. The team with the most points wins.
 Winners: Road Rules
Las Vegas Talent Show: Teams take part in a talent show in front of a live audience in Las Vegas. The winner is determined by judges' votes. The most entertaining show wins.
 Winners: Real World
Boot Camp: Teams are driven to an army boot camp where they are required to live like soldiers for the day and participate in drills. For each drill they complete first, that team earns a point. The team that earns the most points at the end wins.
Infiltration Course: The teams are instructed to get every team member from one end of an obstacle course and into the trenches. The first team to get all the members to cross the finish line wins.
React Station: Teams are given four different sized wooden boards and are required to get every team member and supplies across a course by building a bridge over blue stumps. Players are not allowed to use red stumps or it's an automatic disqualification. The first team to get all the members to cross the finish line wins.
Obstacle Course: Team members face-off against each other in a race through an obstacle course. The first player to get to the end wins.
Two-Line Bridge: Teams are given a load of supplies and must transfer them through an obstacle course. The team that transfers their supplies the fastest wins.
 Winners: Road Rules
Money Chamber: Teams are given the allotted minutes they have earned throughout the season to grab as much money as they can in a money chamber out of $50,000. The team that grabs the most money wins.
 Winners: Road Rules

Game summary

 Real World
 Road Rules

Mini challenges

Final results
Road Rules won the final challenge, earning a total of $39,680, with each team member receiving $6,613.
Real World lost the final challenge, earning $10,240, while also winning an additional $3,000 in the "Teddy Bear Steal" mini-challenge, for a total bank of $13,240, with each team member receiving $2,206.

Episodes

References

External links 
Cast information and show data at the Internet Movie Database

The Challenge (TV series)
1999 American television seasons